Jörg Sievers (born 22 September 1965) is a retired goalkeeper.

Career
He played for Hannover 96 for more than 10 years, and made a club record 384 league appearances, primarily playing in the 2. Bundesliga. He remained with the club through relegation to the Regionalliga and eventually played out his final season in the Bundesliga in 2002. His main career highlight with the club was perhaps winning the 1991–92 DFB-Pokal against Borussia Mönchengladbach, where he saved two crucial penalties during the shootout. On 6 March 2010, he made a comeback with the reserve team of Hannover 96.

Coaching career
In January 2020, Sievers joined up with Daniel Stendel at Heart of Midlothian working as an assistant manager. The duo left in June 2020. A year later, in June 2021, Sievers once again joined up with Stendel, this time at French club  Nancy.

Honours
 DFB-Pokal: 1991–92

Trivia
 He is also known from the song "Jörg Sievers Blues" by the German band Fury in the Slaughterhouse.
 His brother Ralf also played professional football at Eintracht Frankfurt and FC St. Pauli.
 His nickname amongst fans and within the team is "Colt" Sievers, stemming from the phonetic resemblance of his last name to the main character of the 80s TV action series The Fall Guy, "Colt Seavers"

References

German footballers
1965 births
Living people
Bundesliga players
2. Bundesliga players
Hannover 96 players
Association football goalkeepers
People from Uelzen (district)
Footballers from Lower Saxony
West German footballers